The following is a list of episodes from the Disney Junior series Miles from Tomorrowland, which lasted from February 6, 2015 until September 10, 2018 with a total of three seasons.

A total of 144 episode segments being combined into 75 half-hour episodes were produced.

Series overview

Episodes

Season 1 (2015–16)

Season 2 (2016–17) "Galactech"

Season 3 (2017–18) "Mission Force One"

The season debuted on October 16, 2017 as Mission Force One. Due to low ratings, Season 3 ended after 21 episodes.

DJ Melodies (created by Disney Junior)

Released September 19, 2015:
Let's Rocket
Onward and Upward

Messages from Miles

Ten segments as of May 2015, including:

Mission Force One: Connect and Protect 
8 segments released on September 8, 2017:

References

Miles from Tomorrowland